The CSIR-National Environmental Engineering Research Institute (CSIR-NEERI) is a research institute created and funded by Government of India. It was established in Nagpur in the year 1958 with focus on water supply, sewage disposal and communicable disease and to some extent placed on 

Industrial and occupational diseases common in post-independent India. 

NEERI a pioneer laboratory in the field of environmental science and engineering became a part of the Council of Scientific and Industrial Research (CSIR). NEERI has five zonal laboratories at Chennai, Delhi, Hyderabad, Kolkata and Mumbai.

It  falls under the Ministry of Science and Technology (India) within the extended arm of the central government.  NEERI is an important partner organisation in India's POPs National Implementation Plan (NIP).

The National Environmental Engineering Research Institute (NEERI), Nagpur was established in 1958 as Central Public Health Engineering Research Institute (CPHERI), when environmental concerns were limited to human health with a focus on water supply/sewage disposal/ communicable diseases and to some extent on industrial pollution and occupational diseases. The chemical and biological solutions to address these problems were simple, though challenging. However, slowly worldwide public awareness on the contamination of the environment on regional to global scale started getting attention in 1970's. Shrimati Indira Gandhi, the then Prime Minister of India, rechristened the Institute as National Environmental Engineering Research Institute (NEERI) in the year 1974. National Environmental Engineering Research Institute (NEERI), Nagpur is devoted to research and innovations in environmental science and engineering besides solving a range of problems posed by industry, government and public.

Mandate
NEERI states its mandate as:

To conduct research and developmental studies in environmental science and engineering.
To render assistance to the industries of the region, local bodies, etc. in solving the problems of environmental pollution.
To interact and collaborate with academic and research institutions on environmental science and engineering for mutual benefit.
To participate in CSIR thrust area and mission projects

The beginning 
In 1958, water pollution confronted the country's capital city, Delhi. In response to this issue, an organization was created to assess and counter any issue in the public health domain. Thus was created the Central Public Health Engineering Research Institute (CPHERI). CPHERI was established on 8 April 1958 by Council of Scientific & Industrial Research (CSIR) to initially deal with problems of water and air pollution in urban settlements to assist industry, to anticipate problems, provide solutions and to concentrate on regional development. The Institute subsequently provided excellent services to the society in the domain of public health by carrying out various important activities in the areas of water and air environment.
That time environmental concerns were limited to human health with a focus on water supply, sewage disposal and communicable diseases. Later on, worldwide public awareness on the environmental degradation started getting attention. After participating in the "United Nations Inter-Governmental Conference on Human Environment" at Stockholm in 1972, which gave legitimacy to environmental issues, the then Prime Minister of India and President, CSIR, Smt. Indira Gandhi renamed the Central Public Health Engineering Research as the National Environmental Engineering Research Institute (NEERI) in 1974. This was done to encompass the entire vistas of R&D in the area of environmental science and engineering. Accordingly, the Institute delineated thrust areas for R&D comprising Environmental Monitoring, Environmental Biotechnology, Solid & Hazardous Waste Management, Environmental Systems Design Modelling and Optimization, Environmental Impact & Risk Assessment, and Environmental Policy Analysis. Presently, CSIR-NEERI is functioning with headquarters at Nagpur and five Zonal Laboratories located at Mumbai, Kolkata, Delhi, Chennai and Hyderabad.

Between sixties and late seventies, to ensure potable water to communities, NEERI paid special attention to cost-effective process development. The processes for defluoridation, removal of heavy metals and salts, and destruction of microbial organisms were developed by the scientists.  ‘Chlorine tablets’ and ‘Nalgonda technique for defluoridation of water’ developed by the Institute proved to be the major achievements of the Institute in the interest of society. The Institute also helped in designing water treatment plants, involving the application of slow sand filtration and use of membranes. Analytical procedures for rapid and accurate estimation of quality of water were developed and these are now widely in use. Water being an important resource for all life processes and for industry, specific technologies were developed for treatment of industrial wastewaters as well as domestic effluents. Recycling, therefore, has been a very significant area of R&D at the Institute for water management, since wastewater after treatment can be used in agriculture.
Between the mid-eighties and the late nineties, the Institute saw a phenomenal growth in its activities, swelling number of projects and a concomitant overall growth of in-house infrastructure facilities including analytical Instruments. The Institute earned recognition from various International bodies, such as World Health Organization (WHO), UNICEF and United Nations Environment Programme (UNEP) as Centre of Reference for environmental science and technologies. CSIR-NEERI's efforts to combat and mitigate environment degrading activities ranged from development of technologies to cater to the marginal and grass root population through comprehensive "Environmental Impact and Risk Assessment (EIRA)" for industrial, commercial, societal activities of any scale to the development of "Toxic and Hazardous Waste Management Systems" for the chemical and allied industries. While the Institute has played a major role in process / system development for environment management, CSIR-NEERI has provided inputs to the development of environmental statutes such as "Environment Protection Act" and "Hazardous and Other Wastes (Management and Transboundary Movement) Rules".

This was a beginning, where CSIR-NEERI's expertise was developed to give the society solutions to existing problems. From 1990, environmental biotechnology and genomics have emerged as useful tools for sustainable development. The Institute now deals with micro-niches, in which ‘how the DNA structure can be used as a tool to analyse and provide solutions to environmental pollution problems’ is studied. From a microscopic organism to impact assessment of the mega projects like Sethusamudram, the Institute covers all aspects of R&D in environmental science and engineering. The Institute now houses a bacterial culture bank of 1200 bacteria that have been identified sequencing the 16S rRNA genes. These are used in bioremediation as well as in bio-prospecting, The Institute has demonstrated rejuvenation of mine spoil dumpsites and continue to develop additional expertise through an integrated biotechnological approach for detoxification of degraded lands. The technology for solidification / stabilization and immobilization of arsenic bearing hazardous wastes was implemented in Zuari Industries Ltd., Goa. The Institute was involved in providing solutions to some of the pollution problems due to industrial and municipal wastewater discharge in places such as Delhi and Tirupur. The Institute is also involved in the development of analytical protocols for some of the emerging pollutants like dioxins and furans, mercury, trace contaminants besides routine analytical services in environmental monitoring. On the societal front, the Institute offered its services during environmental crises, for example, it has provided drinking water in the areas affected by floods in Rajasthan as well as hilly regions of the country and safe drinking water in fluoride affected areas.  

While the Institute started its journey primarily to address issues related to water pollution, later entries in to air and land made it encompass all the major domains of environment. Over the years the major activities of the Institute in these domains included master plan for the treatment and disposal of sewage in Bombay, water quality assessment for the Hooghly estuary, Indo-US project on treatment and disposal of wastes from phosphatic fertilizer plants and basic organic chemical manufacturing units, Ganga Action Plan, environmental impact and risk assessment for industrial / commercial / societal activities of any scale, assessment of water quality for drinking water supply in various parts of the country, municipal refuse management in various cities and municipalities in the country, solid and hazardous waste management in various chemical / metallurgical industries, recycle / reuse of wastes, ecological rejuvenation of mined areas in various parts of the country, environmental biotechnology and genomics, environmental materials development and assessment and mitigation of environmental damage caused to national monuments such as Taj Mahal.
At present, the focus of the Institute is developing end to end environmental solutions and keep the focus of CSIR NEERI as a place for "Society driven Solution" through use of Science and Engineering and cost-effective and resource recovery-based technologies suitable to socio-economic conditions prevailing in the country. The Institute initiated various R&D activities for effective environmental monitoring in the country. The Institute has been involved in monitoring of pesticide residues at the national level. The Institute also initiated various R&D projects towards waste to wealth, clean potable water and clean air under CSIR-800 programme. CSIR-NEERI was nominated as ‘Stockholm Convention Regional Centre on Persistent Organic Pollutants for Asia Region’ in September 2010 and has been endorsed as the ‘Regional Centre for Capacity Building and Technology Transfer’ at COP-5 Meeting held at Geneva. This centre aims to conduct research and development studies in the area of Persistent Organic Pollutants (POPs) and new POPs along with special focus to promote their environmentally sound management, capacity building and awareness raising campaigns in the region.

R&D thrust areas

Environmental monitoring  
One of the most significant R&D thrust areas of CSIR-NEERI is environmental monitoring. The Institute is operating a nation-wide air quality monitoring network since 1978.  The programme sponsored by the Central Pollution Control Board (CPCB) since 1990 has generated a time series data on air quality for ten major Indian cities – Ahmedabad, Kolkata, Chennai, Delhi, Hyderabad, Jaipur, Kanpur, Kochi, Mumbai and Nagpur. The Institute has developed an extensive database for pollutants such as inhalable dust, sulphur dioxide, nitrogen dioxide, hydrogen sulphide, ammonia, lead and polycyclic aromatic hydrocarbons.  Air pollution monitoring is being done in terms of urban ambient air quality, industrial air quality / fugitive emission, vehicle emission monitoring and stack monitoring.  Air quality modelling is being done in terms of source dispersion modelling, point industrial emission, vehicular emission and area source emission, prediction of ambient air quality under different scenario in space and time, receptor modelling of particulate matter for source apportionment analysis and air quality trend analysis using statistical and neural network tools. The Institute is also involved in design and development of air pollution control systems in terms of emissions generation, treatment studies and design of air pollution control systems for small/medium scale industries. R & D activities in the area of environmental monitoring include development of efficient analytical techniques and low cost instruments, designing of national monitoring networks, development of national databases and training of manpower. The emphasis on development and application of monitoring techniques is now towards the use of PCR and gene probes for water quality monitoring, use of biological indicators for pollution monitoring and application of remote sensing and GIS. A portable arsenic estimation field kit has been developed by the Institute which can measure arsenic concentration below the maximum permissible limit of 10 ppb.

Environmental biotechnology and genomics 
The Institute is involved in R&D studies related to environmental biotechnology and subsequent application of biotechnology based solutions for environmental problems and sustainable development. The Institute is pursuing multidisciplinary R&D in fundamental and applied areas of environmental biotechnology by exploiting knowledge base from microbiology, biochemistry, chemistry, molecular biology, chemical and environmental engineering disciplines. The Institute aims at developing eco-friendly biotechnological processes targeting societal and industrial needs to address issues related to restoration of environmental quality, bioremediation/waste treatment, waste to wealth, climate change mitigation etc. R & D activities in the field of environmental biotechnology have been undertaken related to the development and demonstration of technologies for substitution of non-renewable resource base with renewable resources, recycle and reuse of industrial and domestic wastewater, and utilization of industrial wastes and biomass for commercial production of chemicals. R & D studies on environmental biotechnology have led to the development of a microbial consortium to degrade persistent synthetic chlorinated cyclodiene and endosulfan.

The Institute is involved in R&D studies related to the existence, interaction, and survival of different gene pools with reference to each other in complex ecosystems.  Monitoring tools with versatile computer modelling and simulation techniques have enabled the Institute to understand and explore a more holistic view of the interrelated aspects of environmental systems.  At molecular level, the Institute carries out the study of structure, function, and interaction of the different gene pools, which are the constituents of the biogeochemical cycles of different components of the ecosystem. The Institute covers the study of either of the environmental factors, which can influence any life form including humans, plants, animals, and microorganisms.

Environmental impact and risk assessment 
CSIR-NEERI ensures integration of environmental and socio-economic concerns in developmental planning by identifying environmental, biological and socio-economic impacts of proposed development projects and adopting remedial or mitigation measures including risk assessment. The studies carried out by the Institute enabled the developers and the government to abate the economic, social and environmental (including human health) impacts and develop mitigation measures. The Institute so far carried out environmental impact and risk assessment studies for more than 500 developmental projects proposed by various industries such as petrochemicals, oil & natural gas, refineries, mining, power plants (thermal, hydro and nuclear), chemicals and fertilizers, ports & harbours, irrigation and infrastructure, etc. EIA studies carried out by the Institute focused on analysis of concepts, approaches, methodology and evaluation processes; use of new technology development tools to enhance and strengthen the procedures and evaluation processes for impact assessment and recommendation with appropriate environmental management plan for sustainable development.

Environmental systems design & modelling   
This Institute is involved in development and application of numerical models for prediction of environmental quality; development and application of Geographical Information System (GIS) and  Remote Sensing (RS) based models and analytical tools for natural resources  management;  development and application of environmental systems design, detailed engineering, costing and drawings for the design of water supply and sewerage systems; development and application of environmental systems design, detailed engineering, costing and drawings for the design of water and wastewater treatment systems; application of advanced numerical and graphics tools (SPSS, MATLAB, ANN etc.) for environmental systems analysis and management.

Water technology and management 
The Institute is involved in the following R&D activities: environmental impact assessment and delineation of environmental management plan of water resources development projects; water conservation and environmental protection of the water bodies; eco-restoration of impounded surface water bodies and downstream system; limnological studies of surface water bodies; assessment of groundwater contamination from anthropogenic stresses; development of technique and methodology for exploration, assessment and management of groundwater in hard rock areas; delineation of contaminated region by geophysical methods, non-invasive methods in characterization of water and land environment; surveillance of drinking water quality;  performance evaluation of water treatment facilities; technology development for improvement of water quality;  development of analytical techniques for water quality assessment; monitoring and management of priority organic pollutants (POPs) and other pollutants;  evaluation of water resources for health related water quality parameters; water quality management for pesticides contamination; restoration and remediation of degraded land; treatment of urban and industrial wastewater;  catchment area treatment plan; techno-economic feasibility of steep slope stabilization through bio-engineering techniques;   green belt development - land use planning; crop loss assessment due to various anthropocentric activities; protection of natural sources; and  assessment of salinity ingress in coastal areas.  The technology developed by CSIR-NEERI helped to set-up solar electrolytic defluoridation plants at various fluoride affected regions in the country. This technology is ensuring safe drinking water to the local people. The Institute has developed a water purification system – ‘NEERI ZAR’ suitable for potable water supply particularly under emergency situations like floods, heavy rainfall, or cyclones, and does not require electric supply.

Solid & hazardous waste management 
The Institute is involved in the following R&D activities in the area of solid & hazardous  waste management: development of rapid composting technologies; waste to energy research; recycled organics utilization; monitoring of green house gas (GHG) emissions from landfills; quantification and characterization of solid waste; designing of secure landfills; eco-toxicological studies on landfill leachates; occupational health risk assessment on municipal solid waste (MSW) workers; transportation system designing for MSW transportation; E-waste management; cleaner technologies and waste minimization; recycling and reuse of MSW; bio-medical waste management; identification of hazardous waste streams; quantification and characterization of hazardous waste; development of treatment systems; and source reduction and recycling. The scientists are trying to develop a cost-effective process for bio-methanation of municipal solid waste with two-phase approach to generate bio-energy from the municipal solid waste. 

CSIR-NEERI helped Hindustan Unilever Ltd. (HUL) in remediation of its mercury contaminated site at Kodaikanal by providing a suitable technology. The Institute has also given an effective technological solution for environmentally sound management of hazardous wastes generated by NICOMET Industries Ltd.

Wastewater treatment technologies 
CSIR-NEERI has been instrumental in designing and commissioning Common Effluent Treatment Plants (CETPs) for homogenous and heterogeneous industrial clusters in the country. CETPs designed and commissioned by CSIR-NEERI at various industrial clusters helped in prevention of water and soil pollution. 767 small scale industrial units in Pali, 249 in Balotra, and over 2000 industrial units in NCT of Delhi revived due to CETPs and as a result the employment of thousands of workers was protected, since these industrial units were on the verge of closure due to non-compliance of the pollution prevention norms. CETPs also helped in achieving ‘Economics of Scale’ in waste treatment, thereby reducing the cost of pollution abatement. CSIR-NEERI has carried out feasibility assessment studies of CETPs including identification of types and volumes of wastes generated, estimation of future waste loads, identification of treatment options, and evaluation of cleaner technologies. It has provided treatment options for zero liquid discharge for wastewater management for CETPs of textile industries in Tirupur and Ludhiana. Recently, the Institute has developed a two-stage bio-oxidation (TSB) process for treatment of high COD and ammonia bearing wastewater through ‘separated heterotrophic-autotrophic reactions’. This process eliminates chemical treatment and denitrification step. TSB process is implemented on large scale at Nagarjuna Agrochemical Limited, Srikakulam, A. P. CSIR-NEERI developed a design for the treatment and zero discharge of treated effluent of automobile industry through High Rate Transpiration System (HRTS) and this technology has been implemented at M/s Mahindra Vehicle Manufacture Limited, Pune. The Institute has developed a ‘phytorid sewage treatment technology’ which involves a constructed wetland exclusively designed for the treatment of municipal, urban, agricultural and industrial wastewater. This technology has been implemented by various industries and urban local bodies in the country.

Environmental policy analysis 
CSIR-NEERI has been instrumental in formulation of environmental policies by carrying out analyses of existing policies against the international commitments and prevailing socio-economic conditions. The Institute has recommended various mechanisms so as to devise policy, planning, legal and informational measures for sustainable development. The Institute has been involved in the development of information packages on cleaner technologies for industrial production. From time to time the Institute has also been directed by the courts to provide inspection reports on various projects and review the existing enviro-legal framework.

Skill development 
The Institute has established a Centre for Skill Development where certificate courses will be conducted in the domains of environmental impact assessment, carrying capacity, and water quality monitoring & assessment.

References

Research institutes in Nagpur
Council of Scientific and Industrial Research
Environmental engineering
Science and technology in Maharashtra
Ministry of Science and Technology (India)
Research institutes established in 1958
1958 establishments in Bombay State